HMS Cleopatra was a  of the Royal Navy. She was built by R. and W. Hawthorn, Leslie and Company, Limited (Hebburn-on-Tyne, UK), with the keel being laid down on 5 January 1939. She was launched on 27 March 1940, and commissioned on 5 December 1941.

Second World War service
Cleopatra went out to Gibraltar early in 1942, and on 9 February she sailed for Malta, where she was immediately damaged by a bomb. After repair, she was transferred to Alexandria in early March for the 15th Cruiser Squadron. She was Admiral Philip Vian's flagship during the Second Battle of Sirte, when his group of four light cruisers and 17 destroyers held off an Italian force which included the battleship , two heavy cruisers, a light cruiser and 10 destroyers, which had all been sent to intercept their convoy to Malta. During the engagement, Cleopatras radar and wireless stations were wrecked by a 6" round fired by the Italian light cruiser .  Other reports state that Cleopatras after turrets were also damaged. In June 1942, she covered Operation Harpoon and Vigorous, and in August bombarded Rhodes as a diversion for the Operation Pedestal convoy.

Cleopatra was drydocked in Massawa on 19 September 1942 for minor repairs and cleaning and was undocked five days later. During the refloating, she slipped on the angled drydock, crushing every wooden keel block on the dock but sustaining little hull damage to herself. Captain G. Grantham considered the resulting leak a minor nuisance and ordered Cleopatra to return to service.

By January 1943, Cleopatra was part of Force "K", later Force "Q" at Bône, from where the Axis traffic to and from Tunisia was attacked. Later, she was a unit of the 12th Cruiser Squadron, and was present at the landings in Sicily, Operation Husky, in June, followed by supporting the army ashore. Temporary repairs were made at Malta which lasted until October 1943, after which she sailed to Philadelphia, US, for full repairs. Like , Cleopatra was fitted with quad Bofors in place of its pom poms. Mediterranean experience had shown that air attacks over the bow were common, and more forward fire power was provided with the quad Bofors in "B" position. These were completed in November 1944, and in 1945 she went out to the East Indies, where she was the first ship into the newly recaptured base at Singapore in September.

Post war service
Cleopatra served post-war with the 5th Cruiser Squadron in the East Indies until returning to Portsmouth on 7 February 1946 to refit. Thereafter, she joined the Home Fleet, 2nd Cruiser Squadron, from 1946 to early 1951 and after a major refit and minimal update with the quad Bofors landed and replaced by 3 twin Mk 5 40 mm guns,. In 1948 she was commanded by P Reid. She served in the Mediterranean from late 1951-early 1953. While in the Mediterranean, she took a starring role in the 1953 film of C.S. Foresters Brown on Resolution, (called Sailor of the King in Britain, and Single-handed in the United States). Cleopatra plays both the fictional Royal Navy ships "HMS Amesbury" and "HMS Stratford". The two battle sequences depict this open-bridge light-cruiser firing her guns and torpedoes in some detail.

She returned to Chatham on 12 February 1953 to be paid off.  In June of that year she took part in the Fleet Review to celebrate the Coronation of Queen Elizabeth II. From late 1953 to 1956 Cleopatra was flagship of the reserve squadron. On 15 December 1958, she arrived at the Newport yard of J Cashmore for breaking up.

References

Publications

External links

 WWII cruisers
 HMS Cleopatra at Uboat.net
  www.hmscleopatra.co.uk

 

Dido-class cruisers
Ships built on the River Tyne
1940 ships
World War II cruisers of the United Kingdom
Maritime incidents in July 1943